Mayfield Township is one of nineteen townships in DeKalb County, Illinois, USA. As of the 2010 census, its population was 929 and it contained 414 housing units. Mayfield Township was renamed from Liberty Township on November 20, 1850.

Geography

Unincorporated towns
 Clare at 
 Five Points at 
 Wilkinson at

Cemeteries
 Ault Road
 Mayfield

Airports and landing strips
 Anderson Airport
 Marx V Stott Airport

Demographics

School districts
 Genoa-Kingston Community Unit School District 424
 Hiawatha Community Unit School District 426
 Sycamore Community Unit School District 427

Political districts
 Illinois's 16th congressional district
 State House District 70
 State Senate District 35

References
 
 United States Census Bureau 2009 TIGER/Line Shapefiles
 United States National Atlas

External links
 City-Data.com
 Illinois State Archives
 Township Officials of Illinois
 DeKalb County Official Site

Townships in DeKalb County, Illinois
1850 establishments in Illinois
Townships in Illinois